Gymnothorax richardsonii is a moray eel found in coral reefs in the Pacific and Indian oceans. It was first named by Pieter Bleeker in 1852, and is commonly known as the Richardson's moray, little moray, spotted-lip moray, or the Y-lined moray.

References

richardsonii
Fish described in 1862